The arcuate horseshoe bat (Rhinolophus arcuatus) is a species of bat in the family Rhinolophidae. It is found in Indonesia, Malaysia, Papua New Guinea, and the Philippines.

Taxonomy and etymology
It was described as a new species in 1871 by German zoologist Wilhelm Peters. Its species name "arcuatus" is Latin for "curved," though Peters gave no explanation as to why he named it thus. Strahan and Conder hypothesized that it was a reference to the appearance of its nose-leaf.

Biology and ecology
It is nocturnal, roosting in sheltered places during the day such as limestone caves. At night it forages for its insect prey by gleaning them off substrates and aerial hawking.

Range and habitat
Its range includes several countries in Southeast Asia, including Malaysia, the Philippines, and Indonesia. It is also found in Papua New Guinea in Oceania.

Conservation
As of 2021, it is evaluated as data deficient by the IUCN.

References

External link

Rhinolophidae
Bats of Oceania
Bats of Southeast Asia
Bats of Indonesia
Bats of Malaysia
Mammals of the Philippines
Mammals of Papua New Guinea
Mammals of Western New Guinea
Mammals described in 1871
Taxonomy articles created by Polbot
Taxa named by Wilhelm Peters
Bats of New Guinea